Club Bàsquet Girona 2014 is a Spanish basketball club based in Girona, Catalonia, that was founded in 2014 by NBA player Marc Gasol.

History
The club was founded in 2014 by NBA player Marc Gasol, who previously played in CB Girona between 2006 and 2008, with the name of Club Escola Bàsquet Marc Gasol. In its first years, the club only competed in youth categories.

In 2016, it added the name of the city of Girona to the name of the club thus becoming CEB Girona Marc Gasol and one year later, it changed again its name to simply Bàsquet Girona.

Also in 2017, and with the aim to become the main men's basketball club in the city, the club created the senior squad that would start competing in the fourth-tier Liga EBA after achieving a vacant spot in the league. Quim Costa would be the head coach for the debut season.

In November 2021, Gasol announced he would play with the club, by that time in LEB Oro, through the end of the 2021–22 season before deciding whether to retire from play.

The club earned promotion to the Liga ACB for the first time in its history, after defeating Movistar Estudiantes in the LEB Oro playoff final, 66-60.

Season by season

Players

Current roster

Depth chart

Notable players
 Marc Gasol
 Jordi Trias

References

External links 
 Official website
 Profile at FEB.es

Sport in Girona
Catalan basketball teams
Liga EBA teams
Basketball teams established in 2014